Uropetala is a small genus of very large dragonflies in the family Petaluridae. They are endemic to New Zealand. Unlike most dragonflies, the larvae are not aquatic, but terrestrial, living in flooded burrows in damp forest or banks.

The genus contains only two species:
Uropetala carovei  – bush giant dragonfly
Uropetala chiltoni  – mountain giant dragonfly

References

External links 
 Uropetala dragonflies discussed on RNZ Critter of the Week, 16 September 2016

Petaluridae